Symphony No. 21 in A major, K. 134, is a symphony that was composed by Wolfgang Amadeus Mozart in August 1772.

Structure
The symphony has the scoring of two flutes, two horns, and strings.

There are four movements:

Allegro, 
Andante, 
Menuetto — Trio, 
Allegro,

References

External links

21
1772 compositions
Compositions in A major